This is a list of Italian football transfers featuring at least one Serie A or Serie B club which were completed from August 1, 2013 to September 2, 2013, the date in which the summer transfer window closed. Free agents could join any club at any time.

August to 2 September 2013
Legend
Those clubs in Italic indicate that the player already left on loan in previous season or 2013 new signing that immediately left the club
Non-EU transfer from and to abroad were marked yellow, excluding loan deal that turned definitive and renewed loans. Serie A clubs could only sign 2 non-EU players from abroad by certain criteria, such as replace departed non-EU player or the club completely did not have non-EU players.

Out of window transfers

Footnotes

References

Transfers
Italian
2013